The 2012 Elite Football League of India season or 2012 EFLI season was the debut season of Elite Football League of India and began on 22 September 2012. Eight franchises contested for the Elite Bowl, among whom five located in India, two in Sri Lanka and one in Pakistan.

The Pune Marathas claimed the title after defeating Delhi Defenders 6–0 in the Elite Bowl I on 10 November 2012 and became the first ever champions of an Elite Bowl.

Broadcasting
Games were shown on Ten Sports and Ten Action with four matches per week on Saturday, Sunday, Monday and Tuesday.

Teams

Venues

Regular season

Standings
East

West

  Advanced to the Elite Bowl Qualifier

Fixtures
Following a complete list with results.

Playoffs

Elite Bowl Qualifier

Elite Bowl I

Awards
Roshan Lobo, a Running Back of the Warhawks, was named MVP of the season.

References

Elite Football League of India seasons
2012 in American football
2012 in Indian sport